Beaumont Griffith Jarrett (18 July 1855 – 11 April 1905) was an English footballer who earned three caps for the national team between 1876 and 1878. Jarrett played club football for Cambridge University.

Born in Cheapside, London, Jarret attended Harrow school and later went up to Cambridge. He played football for his school between 1876 and 1878, becoming captain in 1877. He also played for Old Harrovians and Grantham Town F.C.

Jarrett played for the Old Harrovians in the 1877–78 FA Cup semi-final and was the Royal Engineers A.F.C.-nominated umpire for the final.

Jarret was ordained in 1878 and continued his career with the church.

References

1855 births
1905 deaths
English footballers
England international footballers
People educated at Harrow School
Cambridge University A.F.C. players
Grantham Town F.C. players
Association football defenders